"Does That Blue Moon Ever Shine on You", or simply "Blue Moon", is a song written and recorded by American country music artist Toby Keith. It was released on February 27, 1996 as the lead single from his 1996 album Blue Moon. The song peaked at number 2 on the US Billboard Hot Country Songs chart and reached number 9 in Canada. Keith wrote the song in 1987, and first released it that year on an independent label. It is the first lead single by Keith that does not feature as the opening track.

Critical reception
Deborah Evans Price, of Billboard magazine reviewed the song favorably, calling it "a perfect example of a Keith-penned weeper that is also a sensuous and languid ballad." She goes on to say that the ballad is a "perfect showcase for Keith's vocals, which have never sounded better." The song works well according to Price because of the "poignancy of the lyric and the way the production shows the strength of his voice."

Music video
The song's music video was directed by Marc Ball, and premiered on CMT on March 1, 1996, when CMT named it a "Hot Shot".

Chart performance
"Does That Blue Moon Ever Shine on You" debuted at number 65 on the Hot Country Singles & Tracks chart for the week of March 9, 1996.

Year-end charts

References

1996 singles
Toby Keith songs
Songs written by Toby Keith
Polydor Records singles
1996 songs